Clepsis is a genus of moths belonging to the family Tortricidae. It includes several notable pest species.

Species

Clepsis aba Razowski, 1979
Clepsis abscisana (Zeller, 1877)
Clepsis aerosana (Lederer, 1853)
Clepsis agenjoi Obraztsov, 1950
Clepsis aliana Kawabe, 1965
Clepsis altitudinarius (Filipjev, 1962)
Clepsis anderslaneyii Dombroskie & J.W. Brown, 2009
Clepsis archidona Razowski, 1999
Clepsis assensiodes Razowski, 2004
Clepsis assensus Razowski & Pelz, 2004
Clepsis balcanica (Rebel, 1917)
Clepsis banhadana Razowski & Becker, 2003
Clepsis bertiogana Razowski & Becker, 2010
Clepsis biformis (Meyrick, 1920)
Clepsis brachyptycta (Meyrick, 1938)
Clepsis browni Razowski & Pelz, 2004
Clepsis brunneograpta Razowski & Pelz, 2004
Clepsis brunneotona Razowski & Becker, 2010
Clepsis brusquea Razowski & Becker, 2003
Clepsis burgasiensis (Rebel, 1916)
Clepsis camposana Razowski & Becker, 2003
Clepsis canariensis (Rebel, in Rebel & Rogenhofer, 1896)
Clepsis capnosticha (Meyrick, 1917)
Clepsis carillana Razowski & Becker, 2003
Clepsis catarinana Razowski & Becker, 2003
Clepsis celsana (Kennel, 1919)
Clepsis centonata Razowski & Becker, 1999
Clepsis chishimana Oku, 1965
Clepsis chlorodoxa (Meyrick, 1920)
Clepsis clemensiana (Fernald, 1879)
Clepsis confragosa Razowski & Becker, 2003
Clepsis consimilana (Hübner, [1814-1817])
Clepsis coriacana (Rebel, in Rebel & Rogenhofer, 1894)
Clepsis cremnobates (Walsingham, 1914)
Clepsis crinis Razowski, 1979
Clepsis crispata (Meyrick, 1912)
Clepsis crispinana (Kennel, 1919)
Clepsis cristobaliana Razowski & Becker, 2003
Clepsis danilevskyi Kostyuk, 1973
Clepsis devexa (Meyrick, 1926)
Clepsis diversa Razowski & Becker, 2010
Clepsis domabilis Razowski & Becker, 1999
Clepsis dubia Razowski & Becker, 2003
Clepsis dumicolana (Zeller, 1847)
Clepsis ecclisis (Walsingham, 1914)
Clepsis enervis Razowski, 1979
Clepsis enochlodes (Meyrick, 1938)
Clepsis eura Razowski, 1979
Clepsis exaraesima Razowski & Becker, 2003
Clepsis fatiloqua Razowski, 1979
Clepsis finitima Razowski, 1979
Clepsis flavidana (McDunnough, 1923)
Clepsis flavifasciaria Wang Li & Wang, 2003
Clepsis fluxa Razowski & Becker, 2003
Clepsis fraterna Razowski & Pelz, 2004
Clepsis fucana (Walsingham, 1879)
Clepsis fumosa Razowski & Becker, 2003
Clepsis gelophodes (Meyrick, 1936)
Clepsis gemina Razowski, 1979
Clepsis gerasimovi Danilevsky, 1963
Clepsis gnathocera Razowski, 2006
Clepsis griseotona Razowski & Becker, 2010
Clepsis hissarica Danilevsky, 1963
Clepsis hohuanshanensis Kawabe, 1985
Clepsis homophyla (Meyrick, 1917)
Clepsis humana (Meyrick, 1912)
Clepsis illustrana (Krogerus, 1936)
Clepsis ingenua (Meyrick, 1912)
Clepsis insignata Oku, 1963
Clepsis joaquimana Razowski & Becker, 1999
Clepsis jordaoi Razowski & Becker, 2010
Clepsis kearfotti Obraztsov, 1962
Clepsis ketmenana (Falkovitsh, in Danilevsky, Kuznetsov & Falkovitsh, 1962)
Clepsis labisclera Razowski & Becker, 2010
Clepsis laetitiae Soria, 1997
Clepsis laetornata Wang Li & Wang, 2003
Clepsis laxa Razowski, 1979
Clepsis leptograpta (Meyrick, 1924)
Clepsis limana Razowski & Becker, 2003
Clepsis lindebergi (Krogerus, 1952)
Clepsis lineata Razowski & Pelz, 2004
Clepsis listerana (Kearfott, 1907)
Clepsis longilabis Razowski & Becker, 2010
Clepsis luctuosana (Rebel, 1914)
Clepsis lutosulana (Zeller, 1877)
Clepsis maracayana Razowski & Becker, 2003
Clepsis mehli (Opheim, 1964)
Clepsis melaleucanus (Walker, 1863)
Clepsis melissa (Meyrick, 1908)
Clepsis metalleta (Walsingham, 1914)
Clepsis microceria Razowski & Wojtusiak, 2010
Clepsis microchone Razowski & Becker, 2003
Clepsis micromys (Stringer, 1929)
Clepsis miserulana (Zeller, 1877)
Clepsis misgurna Razowski, 1992
Clepsis moeschleriana (Wocke, 1862)
Clepsis monochroa Razowski, 2006
Clepsis monticolana Kawabe, 1964
Clepsis murzini Gibeaux, 1999
Clepsis naucinum Razowski, 1992
Clepsis neglectana (Herrich-Schäffer, 1851)
Clepsis neomelissa (Rose & Pooni, 2004)
Clepsis nevadae Razowski & Wojtusiak, 2006
Clepsis nybomi Hackman, 1950
Clepsis oblimatana (Kennel, 1901)
Clepsis octogona (Bradley, 1965)
Clepsis opinabilis Razowski, 1979
Clepsis orycta (Walsingham, 1914)
Clepsis pallidana (Fabricius, 1776)
Clepsis paralaxa Razowski & Becker, 2010
Clepsis parassensus Razowski, 2004
Clepsis parorycta Razowski & Becker, 2003
Clepsis parva Razowski, 2004
Clepsis peguncus Razowski & Wojtusiak, 2013
Clepsis pelospila (Meyrick, 1932)
Clepsis penetralis Razowski, 1979
Clepsis peritana (Clemens, 1860)
Clepsis persicana (Fitch, 1856)
Clepsis phaeana (Rebel, 1916)
Clepsis pinaria Razowski & Becker, 2010
Clepsis plumbeolana (Bremer, 1865)
Clepsis poliochra (Meyrick, 1920)
Clepsis powelli Razowski, 1979
Clepsis praeclarana (Kennel, 1899)
Clepsis provocata (Meyrick, 1912)
Clepsis rasilis Razowski, 1979
Clepsis razowskii Kawabe, 1992
Clepsis retiferana (Stainton, 1859)
Clepsis rogana (Guenée, 1845)
Clepsis rolandriana (Linnaeus, 1758)
Clepsis rurinana (Linnaeus, 1758)
Clepsis sarthana (Ragonot, 1894)
Clepsis scaeodoxa (Meyrick, 1935)
Clepsis semanta Razowski & Becker, 2003
Clepsis senecionana (Hübner, [1818-1819])
Clepsis siciliana (Ragonot, 1894)
Clepsis smicrotes (Walsingham, 1914)
Clepsis soriana (Kennel, 1899)
Clepsis spectrana (Treitschke, 1830)
Clepsis spirana Razowski, 1979
Clepsis staintoni Obraztsov, 1955
Clepsis steineriana (Hübner, [1796-1799])
Clepsis stenophora (Bradley, 1965)
Clepsis subcostana (Stainton, 1859)
Clepsis subjunctana (Wollaston, 1858)
Clepsis taima Razowski & Becker, 2003
Clepsis tannuolana Kostyuk, 1973
Clepsis tassa Razowski & Pelz, 2004
Clepsis teopiscae Razowski & Becker, 2003
Clepsis terevalva Razowski & Wojtusiak, 2008
Clepsis tetraplegma (Diakonoff, 1957)
Clepsis translucida (Meyrick, 1908)
Clepsis trifasciata Trematerra, 2010
Clepsis trileucana (Doubleday, 1847)
Clepsis trivia (Meyrick, 1913)
Clepsis truculenta Razowski, 1979
Clepsis tuxtlana Razowski & Becker, 2003
Clepsis uncisecta Razowski & Wolff, in Razowski, 1998
Clepsis unicolorana (Duponchel, in Godart, 1835)
Clepsis violacea Razowski, 1966
Clepsis virescana (Clemens, 1865)
Clepsis vitiana (Zeller, 1877)
Clepsis zelleriana (Erschoff, 1874)
Clepsis zeuglodon Razowski, 1979
Clepsis zoquipana Razowski & Becker, 2003

Status unclear
Clepsis antigona (Meyrick, 1931), described as Tortrix antigona from Bulgaria.
Clepsis substrigana (Constantini, 1923), described as Tortrix substrigana from Italy.

References

 , 1845, Annls Soc. ent. Fr (2)3: 149.
 , 2005: World catalogue of insects volume 5 Tortricidae.
 , 2009: A new species of Clepsis Guenée, 1845 (Lepidoptera: Tortricidae) from the Sky Islands of Southeastern Arizona. Proceedings of the Entomological Society of Washington 111(4): 769–774. Abstract:  
 , 2010: Systematic and distributional data on Neotropical Archipini (Lepidoptera: Tortricidae). Acta Zoologica Cracoviensia 53B (1-2): 9-38. . Full article:  .
  2010: An annotated catalogue of the types of Tortricidae (Lepidoptera) in the collection of the Royal Museum for Central Africa (Tervuren, Belgium) with descriptions of new genera and new species. Zootaxa 2469: 1-77. Abstract: .
 , 2013: An illustrated catalogue of the specimens of Tortricidae in the Iziko South African Museum, Cape Town (Lepidoptera: Tortricidae). Shilap Revista de Lepidopterologia 41 (162): 213–240.
 , 2006: Tortricidae from Venezuela (Lepidoptera: Tortricidae). Shilap Revista de Lepidopterologia 34 133: 35-79 
 , 2010: Tortricidae (Lepidoptera) from Peru. Acta Zoologica Cracoviensia 53B (1-2): 73-159. . Full article:  .
 , 2013: Accessions to the fauna of Neotropical Tortricidae (Lepidoptera). Acta Zoologica Cracoviensia, 56 (1): 9-40. Full article: .
 , 2010: Clepsis trifasciata sp. n. with notes on some Lepidoptera Tortricidae from Kirgizstan. Journal of Entomological and Acarological Research Serie II 42 (1): 1-10. Abstract and full article:

External links
Fauna Europaea
Nomina Insecta Nearctica
tortricidae.com

 
Archipini
Tortricidae genera
Taxa named by Achille Guenée